The Royal Asiatic Society Korea Branch is a learned society based in Seoul, South Korea. Established in 1900 as the world's first Korean studies organization, it was founded to provide a platform for scholarly research on the history, culture and natural landscapes of the Korean Peninsula. It is thought to be the oldest English-language academic organization now existing that is devoted exclusively to the discipline known as Korean studies.

Its annual journal, Transactions, has been described as being "for much of the 20th century, the most important Western-language source on Korean culture."

Early history
The Society was first established on June 16, 1900, when a founding meeting attended by seventeen men (all but four of them Protestant missionaries) was held in the Reading Room of the Seoul Union Club. On that day officers were elected and a constitution (based on that of the Royal Asiatic Society of Great Britain and Ireland) was adopted. The British RAS immediately acknowledged the establishment of the Korea Branch and authorized the use of its name. Among those present at the inaugural meeting were the acting British Chargé d'affaires, J. H. Gubbins, (who became the first president) and the missionaries James Scarth Gale, Homer B. Hulbert, George Heber Jones, Horace Grant Underwood, Henry Gerhard Appenzeller, D. A. Bunker and William B. Scranton. Other missionaries who were members of the RASKB from the very start included the medical doctors Horace N. Allen, Oliver R. Avison and the Anglican priest (later bishop) Mark Napier Trollope. Although most were not subjects of the British crown, many were intimately known to the Joseon royalty.

From the start, the Society's main activity was the presentation and discussion of scholarly papers by members at occasional meetings. These papers were then published in an annual journal titled Transactions of the Korea Branch of the Royal Asiatic Society.

From 1900 until the end of 1902, the Society met regularly, papers were presented and subsequently published. From early in 1903, however, its activities ceased and did not resume until a new president and council were elected early in 1911. Among the reasons for this interruption may be cited the death or departure from Korea of many of the founding members, and the troubling events of those years, including the Russo-Japanese War and the annexation of the Korean Empire by Japan in 1910.

After 1911, however, the Society continued to meet and publish Transactions regularly until the outbreak of the Pacific War at the end of 1941. Shortly after the Japanese occupation began, the RASKB published three Japanese-authored papers, all three of which had colonialist agendas; the RASKB had no more to say officially on Japanese imperialism until after liberation in 1945.

Many of the papers published in Transactions continue to fascinate scholars of Korean culture even today. They cover a great variety of topics, ranging from the remotest origins of Korean culture, through descriptions of ancient monuments and temples, through lists of the plants and animals found in Korea, to surveys of contemporary gold-mining and ginseng-production.

During this period the Society established a moderately sized lending library. After the surrender of Japan in 1945, a few former members returned to Korea, including Horace Horton Underwood, and the Society resumed its activities.

However, the outbreak of the Korean War in June 1950, led to the suspension of its activities. The president for 1950, the Anglican priest Charles Hunt as well as Irish Anglican nun Mother Mary Clare, who had contributed articles on botany to the societies journal, were among the many foreign missionaries and diplomats taken northward on the so-called Death March by the North Korean forces. Hunt died during the journey in November 1950.

The Modern Period 
It was several years after the end of the Korean War before returning members were able to resume the Society's interrupted activities. Volume XXXII of Transactions dated 1951 and containing reports of activities in early 1950 was printed in Hong Kong in 1951, during the war. Volume XXXIII was dated 1957 and although it still had to be printed in Hong Kong, it records how the first General Meeting of the revived RASKB was held on February 23, 1956. The revived Society quickly grew and flourished.

There were increasing numbers of foreigners living in South Korea, not only diplomats and missionaries but also military, educational and business personnel from many countries. For volunteers in the US Peace Corps program, the meetings were especially important and many retained contact with the RASKB in the following decades. For a long period, the meetings of the RASKB provided a unique chance to learn more about Korean history and culture.

Very soon, the Society began to organize field trips to places of interest, sometimes far removed from Seoul. The difficulties of transportation in post-war Korea were relieved by help from the ministries and military authorities of the Republic of Korea. For a considerable period, the RASKB was alone in providing such programs and the lists of members found at the end of most volumes of Transactions soon rose to over a thousand.

It was at this time, too, that the Society began to publish scholarly and also more popular books about Korea in its own name. In the last decades of the century, it also imported and sold books about Korean topics that had been published abroad. From the late 1970s, it was able to rent an office / bookstore and hire a full-time Korean General Manager. Leading figures in this period include the scholarly Anglican missionary Richard Rutt, Carl Ferris Miller and the third generation of the Underwood family to belong to the RASKB, Horace G. Underwood II.

The Present 
Today, when South Korea is a major figure on the international stage, with hundreds of thousands of foreign residents, the RASKB continues to offer a regular program of lectures, usually twice each month held at the Somerset Palace in downtown Seoul, and excursions and walking tours on weekends.

It has published 92 volumes of Transactions as of June 2018. It maintains a modest library of some 3,000 volumes at the RASKB office in the Christian Building on Daehangno. It also has a monthly reading club focusing on translated Korean literature. Since 2004, the RASKB has been registered with the government of South Korea as a non-profit cultural foundation.

The RASKB continues to celebrate its anniversary every June with a garden party, held either at the UK Embassy or the US ambassador's residence in Jeong-dong.

Presidents of the RAS-KB

References

External links 
 Korea Branch website
London Royal Asiatic Society website
Shanghai branch
Hong Kong branch
Malaysian branch
Sri Lanka branch
Asiatic Society of Japan branch

1900 establishments in Korea
Professional associations based in South Korea
Learned societies of South Korea
Organizations established in 1900
Organizations based in Seoul
Korean studies